The 51st Golden Horse Awards (Mandarin:第51屆金馬獎) took place on  November 22, 2014 at Sun Yat-sen Memorial Hall in Taipei, Taiwan.

References

51st
2014 film awards
2014 in Taiwan